The Crum Road Bridge is a historic bridge near Frederick, Frederick County, Maryland, United States. It spanned Israel Creek southeast of Walkersville. The Crum Road Bridge was built on or about 1875, and was probably constructed by the King Iron Bridge Company of Cleveland, Ohio.

The Crum Road Bridge was listed on the National Register of Historic Places in 1978. It was then listed in the Historic American Engineering Record in 1993. In 1995, the bridge was removed from its original location on Crum Road over Israel Creek to be replaced by a new wide span concrete bridge. The Crum Road Bridge was relocated to the Heritage Farm Park, located several miles west off of Devilbiss Bridge Road for possible future use as a pedestrian bridge. It was again relocated when it was removed from Heritage Farm Park in 2004. It is currently located in Ballenger Creek Park.

See also

List of bridges documented by the Historic American Engineering Record in Maryland
List of bridges on the National Register of Historic Places in Maryland

References

External links
, including photo in 1977, at Maryland Historical Trust

Road bridges on the National Register of Historic Places in Maryland
Bridges in Frederick County, Maryland
King Bridge Company
Historic American Engineering Record in Maryland
National Register of Historic Places in Frederick County, Maryland
Tied arch bridges in the United States